Georges Adwan (born 1947 in Deir el Qamar) is a lawyer and a Lebanese politician. He currently holds the position of vice-president of the executive committee of the Lebanese Forces party since 2005.

Early life 
Adwan was born in Deir al-Qamar of the Chouf district on September 15, 1947.

He completed his secondary studies at the Marian Brothers School in Jounieh and has a bachelor's degree in Lebanese and French Law in the Institute of the Jesuit Fathers of Beirut.

Career

Lebanese civil war and Al-Tanzim 
Syria's military intervention in June 1976, and its tacit endorsement by Georges Adwan (who combined the MoC's presidency with that of secretary-general of the Lebanese Front at the time), however, caused the movement to factionalize, splitting into a pro-Syrian element headed by Adwan himself and a radical anti-Syrian majority gathered around Mahfouz and Zouein. An attempted coup orchestrated by Adwan, in which the latter tried to take over the Tanzim Dekwaneh's military HQ resulted in a deep rift within the organization. Both Mahfouz and Zouein, which opposed Adwan's position and behaviour, played a crucial role in preventing further internal bloodshed among the group member's (despite the fact that Adwan had murdered Tony Khater, a fellow Tanzim member) by regaining control of the movement, and ousting Adwan from the MoC/Tanzim leadership board in late that year.

Modern politics 
He has been an MP in the Lebanese Parliament as a representative of one of the three Maronite seats in Chouf district since the 2005 legislative elections.
Adwan was member of the Commanding Council of the Al-Tanzim Resistance during the Lebanese War. In 1989-1990, he was appointed as the official representative of the Lebanese Forces Resistance led by Samir Geagea during the discussions held with General Michel Aoun commanding the Lebanese army. He is also elected for the 2022 Parliamentary Elections in the Chouf.

See also
Al-Tanzim 
Lebanese Forces
List of Lebanese Forces Deputies in the Lebanese Parliament
Lawyers

References

Lebanese Maronites
1947 births
Living people
Lebanese Forces politicians
Members of the Parliament of Lebanon
People of the Lebanese Civil War
People from Chouf District
Saint Joseph University alumni
Lebanese lawyers